The 2006 Slovak Figure Skating Championships were held in Košice from December 17 through 19, 2005. Skaters competed in the disciplines of men's singles and ladies' singles on the senior and junior levels, and pair skating on the junior.

Senior results

Men

Ladies

Junior results

Men

Ladies

Pairs

External links
 2006 Slovak Figure Skating Championships results

2005 in figure skating
Slovak Figure Skating Championships, 2006
Slovak Figure Skating Championships
2006 in Slovak sport